Allaži Parish is an administrative unit of Sigulda Municipality, Latvia.

References 

Sigulda Municipality
Parishes of Latvia